E. Lily Yu is an American author. In 2012, she won the John W. Campbell Award for Best New Writer. Her short story "The Cartographer Wasps and the Anarchist Bees" was nominated for the Hugo Award for Best Short Story and the World Fantasy Award for Best Short Fiction.

On July 27, 2019, she released the short story Zero in Babel. 

Her first novel, On Fragile Waves, was published in February 2021 from Erewhon Books. The novel was named a finalist for the 2022 Crawford Award presented by the International Association for the Fantastic in the Arts.

Her work has also appeared in various venues such as McSweeney's, Boston Review, Clarkesworld, F&SF, and The Best Science Fiction and Fantasy of the Year.

She attended Princeton University, graduating with an A.B. in 2012.

References

External links
Official site
Facebook
ISFDB
"The Cartographer Wasps and the Anarchist Bees", Clarkesworld Magazine, April 2011

Living people
John W. Campbell Award for Best New Writer winners
Princeton University alumni
Year of birth missing (living people)
21st-century American women writers